Michel Boudart (born 18 June 1924 in Brussels, Belgium; died 2 May 2012) was the William M. Keck Sr. Professor of Chemical Engineering Emeritus at Stanford University.

He earned his BS and MS from the University of Louvain in 1944 and 1947 respectively and earned his PhD in chemistry at Princeton University in 1950 under the guidance of Hugh Stott Taylor.  He was a professor at Princeton until 1961 and briefly at University of California, Berkeley where he help to establish their program in catalysis and reactions engineering.

Joining Stanford University in 1964, he was best known for his role in establishing the Stanford Chemical Engineering department and his work in catalysis. In 1994, he became a professor emeritus. He was a member of the National Academy of Sciences and the National Academy of Engineering and a fellow of the American Association for the Advancement of Science, the American Academy of Arts and Sciences, and the California Academy of Science.

Personal life
Born in Brussels, during the Second World War, he was accepted to the University of Louvain but the university was closed. He was married to his wife Marina d'Haese Boudart. They were avid world travelers and had a daughter and three sons.

References

External links

 Ricardo B. Levy, Jim Dumesic, James A. Cusumano, and Enrique Iglesia, "Michel Boudart", Biographical Memoirs of the National Academy of Sciences (2017)

Stanford University School of Engineering faculty
Princeton University faculty
Princeton University alumni
American chemical engineers
Members of the United States National Academy of Engineering
Members of the United States National Academy of Sciences
1924 births
2012 deaths
Belgian emigrants to the United States